S. armatus  may refer to:
 Sclerosaurus armatus, an extinct reptile species
 Spermophilus armatus, the Uinta ground squirrel, a mammal species native of the northern Rocky Mountains
 Stegosaurus armatus, a dinosaur species